Giuseppe Zamboni (June 1, 1776 – July 25, 1846) was an Italian Roman Catholic priest and physicist who invented the Zamboni pile, an early electric battery similar to the voltaic pile.

Biography
He was born in either Venice (or, depending on the source, Verona) in northern Italy, in June 1776. Shortly after completing his studies in the seminary at Verona, Abate Zamboni was appointed to the chair of physics in the lyceum of that city.
 
He died in Venice on July 25, 1846.

Invention

 
Zamboni is known to students of physics for an improved version of the dry pile (an electric battery which does not use an electrolyte)  which he invented in 1812. It consists of a number of paper discs coated with zinc foil on one side and manganese dioxide on the other; the moisture of the paper serves as a conductor.
 
By pressing a large number of such discs together in a glass tube, an electromotive force can be obtained that is sufficient to deflect the leaves of an ordinary electroscope. By bringing the terminal knobs of the pile near each other and suspending a light brass ball between them, Zamboni devised what was called an electrostatic clock. The device is so named because the ball oscillating between the knobs looks like a pendulum.

In the Oxford Electric Bell experiment at the Clarendon Laboratory at Oxford University, the terminals of what is believed to be such a pile are fitted with bells that have been continuously ringing since the device was set up in 1840. Note that the Zamboni pile is not a hypothetical perpetual motion device, as all action will eventually cease when the zinc is completely oxidized or the manganese exhausted.

Writings
Among Zamboni's works are: "Della pila elettrica a secco" (Venice, 1812); "L'elettromotore perpetuo" (Venice, 1820); "Descrizione d'un nuovo galvanometro" (Venice, 1833).

See also
List of Roman Catholic scientist-clerics

References

 
 
 

19th-century Italian Roman Catholic priests
Catholic clergy scientists
Battery inventors
19th-century Italian physicists
19th-century Italian inventors
1776 births
1846 deaths
Scientists from Venice